Yaka is a minor Bantu language of the Democratic Republic of the Congo, on the north shore of Lake Kivu.

References

Languages of the Democratic Republic of the Congo
Great Lakes Bantu languages